Norum is a surname. Notable people with the surname include:

John Norum (born 1964), Swedish hard rock guitarist of Norwegian background
Kaja Norum (born 1989), Norwegian model and painter
Tone Norum (born 1965), Swedish pop artist

See also
Norm (given name)